Louis Antoine Godey (June 6, 1804 – November 29, 1878) was an American editor and publisher. He was the founder of Godey's Lady's Book in 1837, the first successful American women's fashion magazine.

Biography
Godey was born to Louis and Margaret Godey in New York City. His parents were immigrants from Sens, France who fled during the French Revolution. His family was poor and he had no formal schooling, but he was self-educated.  At age 15, he took a job as a newspaper boy in New York.  Several years later, he moved to Philadelphia and became an editor for the Daily Chronicle.  In 1830, he published the first edition of the Lady's Book, composed of reprinted articles and illustrations from British magazines. In 1837, Godey merged Lady's Book with Ladies' Magazine, the oldest publication of its type, published out of Boston. Godey married Maria Duke in 1833 and had five children.

In 1836, Godey's publishing house was the first American publisher of the seafaring novels of Frederick Marryat. Godey also partnered with fellow publisher Morton McMichael and others to publish the Saturday News, a weekly magazine that focused on families.

Godey wanted to provide more content developed by American authors and hired Sarah Josepha Hale to be editor of Godey's Lady's Book in 1837. She remained the editor until her retirement in 1877. The magazine became extremely popular, becoming America's highest circulated magazine in the 1840s  and reaching over 150,000 subscribers by 1858. Many famous authors were published in Godey's Lady's Book including Nathaniel Hawthorne, Ralph Waldo Emerson, Edgar Allan Poe, Henry Wadsworth Longfellow and Harriet Beecher Stowe.

Godey implemented a service where readers could order copies of engravings published in the magazine and other items. This was a precursor to  mail order catalogs that became popular later in the 19th century. He also developed programs to offer "premiums" or gifts to those that subscribed or renewed their subscriptions. He also innovated and offered reduced subscription rates to groups that pooled their money and purchased multiple copies of the magazine. Godey copyrighted each issue of Godey's Lady's Book starting in 1845, making it one of the first magazines in America to do so.

Godey published two other magazines, The Young People’s Book (1841) and Lady’s Musical Library (1842) with less successful results.

In the 1870s, he retired to St. Augustine, Florida, but returned to Philadelphia where he died in 1878. At the time of his death, his fortune was estimated at $1 million, approximately $26 million today. He and his wife are buried at Laurel Hill Cemetery in Philadelphia.

Citations

Sources

External links

 Columbia Encyclopedia entry for Louis Godey

1804 births
1878 deaths
19th-century American businesspeople
19th-century American newspaper editors
American magazine founders
American people of French descent
American publishers (people)
Burials at Laurel Hill Cemetery (Philadelphia)
Businesspeople from Philadelphia
Editors of Pennsylvania newspapers
Writers from New York City
Writers from Philadelphia